The 11301/11302 Udyan Express is an express train belonging to Indian Railways that run between Mumbai Chhatrapati Shivaji Maharaj Terminus and Bangalore in India. It operates as train number 11301 from Mumbai Chhatrapati Shivaji Maharaj Terminus to Krantivira Sangolli Rayanna railway station (Bengaluru City) and as train number 11302 in the reverse direction serving the states of Maharashtra, Karnataka & Andhra Pradesh.

It is named as the Udyan Express since Bangalore is known as the Garden City of India dotted with many Public Gardens and parks such as Lalbagh Botanical Garden, Cubbon Park etc. and various other parks almost 1 park between evey 4 roads and other large parks in every locality maintained by the BBMP and also there are private gardens. The word "Udyan" means a garden in Sanskrit, Hindi and Marathi and Kannada. The train was previously numbered as 16529/30 Udyan Express and was renumbered to 11301/11302 when the timetable for July 2013 came into effect. This train now shares its rake with the Siddheshwar Express & operational control is now with Central Railway.

This train was started in the year 1983, when the Guntakal–Bangalore (GTL–SBC) route underwent gauge conversion from metre gauge to broad gauge. Prior to this, people that desired a Mumbai–Bangalore train journey had to change trains at Guntakal and travel via Dharmavaram to Bangalore on metre gauge express trains.

Coaches

The 11301/11302 Udyan Express presently has 1 AC 1st Class, 3 AC 2 tier, 3 AC 3 tier, 12 Sleeper Class & 3 General Unreserved coaches.

As with most train services in India, coach composition may be amended at the discretion of Indian Railways depending on demand.

From 24 November 2019, 11301 Udyan Express received LHB coach starting from Mumbai.

Service

The 11301 Udyan Express covers the distance of 1153 kilometres in 24 hours 55 mins (46.59 km/hr) & in 23 hours 55 mins as 11302 Udyan Express (48.21 km/hr).

As the average speed of the train is below 55 km/hr, its fare does not include a Superfast surcharge.

Once the train leaves Maharashtra & crosses into Karnataka, crosses into Andhra Pradesh and re-enters Karnataka again after crossing Hindupur.

It also passes through the Makalidurga Ghats near Bengaluru, which is marked by sharp curves.

Traction

As the route is fully electrified, it is hauled end to end by a KYN-based WAP-7 in both directions.

Time Table

References

External links 
 Route - Indianrailinfo

Named passenger trains of India
Rail transport in Maharashtra
Rail transport in Karnataka
Rail transport in Andhra Pradesh
Express trains in India